Scythris aciella is a moth of the family Scythrididae. It was described by Bengt Å. Bengtsson in 1997. It is found in Tunisia, Egypt and Lebanon.

References

aciella
Moths described in 1997